Vale is an English, Spanish, and Portuguese surname. Notable people with the surname include:

 Angélica Vale (born 1975), Mexican actress, singer and comedian
 Brenda and Robert Vale, architects and researchers in the field of sustainable housing
 Bruno Vale (born 1983), Portuguese footballer
 Danna Sue Vale (born 1944), Australian politician
 Eric Vale (born 1974), American voice actor
 Henry Hill Vale (1831–1875), British architect
 Jack Vale (Australian footballer) (1905–1970), Australian rules footballer
 Jack Vale (comedian) (born 1973), American comedian
 Jason Vale (born 1969), English author, motivational speaker and lifestyle coach
 Jerry Vale (1930–2014), American singer
 John Vale (1835–1909), American Civil War Medal of Honor recipient
 Wylie Vale (1941–2012), American neurochemist

See also
 Vale (disambiguation)
 Vicki Vale, comic book character

 Valek (surname)
 Vales (surname)
 Valev (surname)

English-language surnames
Spanish-language surnames
Portuguese-language surnames